Charles O'Kelly (1621–1695) was an Irish soldier and writer.

O'Kelly was born at Screen or Clonlyon, Aughrim, County Galway, son of John O'Kelly and Isma Hill, daughter of Sir William of Ballybeg, County Carlow. He was educated at St. Omer. He first saw action in Ireland in 1642.

He inherited Aughrim in 1674, and was elected member of parliament (MP) for Roscommon County in 1689. He again fought, this time as a colonel, in the Williamite War in Ireland, serving at Aughrim and Limerick. He later authored Macariae Excidium, or the Destruction of Cyprus, containing the Last Warr and Conquest of that Kingdom, which contains the only account of the battle of Aughrim by a native of the area.

See also
 Feardorcha Ó Cellaigh, fl. 1584 – after 1611
 Tadhg Mór Ua Cellaigh, fl. 986–1014

Bibliography
 Macariae Excidium, or the Destruction of Cyprus, containing the Last Warr and Conquest of that Kingdom, 1692
 Macariae Excidium, ed. by Count Plunkett and Rev. Edmund Hogan, SJ, called The Jacobite War &c. [this edn. substitutes real historical names, Tyrconnell, etc.] (Sealy, Bryers, & Walker 1894; 2nd ed. also 1894), 12o, paper.

References
 Galway Authors, Helen Mahar, 1976

External links
 http://places.galwaylibrary.ie/history/chapter35.html

1621 births
1695 deaths
Irish writers
People from County Galway
Irish soldiers in the army of James II of England
Irish MPs 1689
Members of the Parliament of Ireland (pre-1801) for County Roscommon constituencies